Marcus Caecilius Metellus ( 127–111 BC) was a Roman senator and general. He belonged to the Caecilii Metelli, one of the most prominent aristocratic families in the mid to late Roman Republic. Marcus was the third of four sons of Quintus Caecilius Metellus Macedonicus.

The following year, Metellus became proconsular governor of Corsica and Sardinia, serving until 111 BC. During his tenure, Metellus suppressed an insurrection on the island of Sardinia, for which he celebrated, upon his return to Rome, a triumph in Quintilis (July) 111 BC. Marcus's younger brother, Gaius Caecilius Metellus Caprarius, also celebrated his own triumph on the same day, for his victories in Thrace.

See also
 Caecilii Metelli family tree

References
 
 
 

2nd-century BC Roman consuls
2nd-century BC Roman generals
2nd-century BC Roman praetors
Marcus
Roman governors of Sardinia
Roman triumphators
Moneyers of ancient Rome
Year of birth unknown
Year of death unknown